Octavian Mihail Ionescu (born March 15, 1990) is a Romanian former professional footballer who played as a center back for teams such as Rapid II București, FC Argeș Pitești or Gloria Bistrița, among others.

References

Living people
1990 births
People from Târgoviște
Romanian footballers
Association football defenders
Liga I players
Liga II players
FC Argeș Pitești players
ACF Gloria Bistrița players